Professor Carmen Sammut (born 17 March 1966) is the Pro-Rector for Student and Staff Affairs and Outreach at the University of Malta since 2016.

Carmen Sammut was the Chairperson of Public Broadcasting Services, Malta's national broadcasting station until 31 March 2021.

List of publications 

Sammut-Bonnici, T., Vella, A. J., Baldacchino, G. Cacciottolo, J. M., Sammut, C., & Zammit, S. (2020). Strategic Plan 2020-2025, University of Malta: Malta.

"Freedom of Expression, Demonization and Deification: Continuities and Disruptions in the Maltese Media System”, In Angelos Giannakopoulos (Ed.). Media, Freedom of Speech, and Democracy in the EU and Beyond, S. Daniel Abraham Centre: Tel Aviv.]

Sammut, C. (2019). Meta ltqajt ma’ Marie Louise Coleiro: Ġurnaliżmu, attiviżmu u femminiżmu f’Malta ta’ żgħożitna. (pp 159–170). In Sergio Grech (Ed.). Marie Louise Colerio Preca: Bejn Storja u Miti. Horizons: Malta.

Sammut, C. & Abdilla, N. (2018). Il-Ġurnalizmu u l-Ġlieda għall-Vot tal-Mara Maltija fil-Kuntest Imperjali: Ir-rwol ta’ Mabel Strickland. (pp 197–233). In Sergio Grech (Ed.). Mabel Strickland: Bejn Storja u Miti. Horizons: Malta

Sammut, C. (2017). The Road to Women's Suffrage and Beyond Women's Enfranchisement and the Nation-Building Project in Malta, Central Bank: Malta.
Sammut, C.  (2017). Collective memory and amnesia: Gender in the Siege narratives, Valletta, Department of Information (publication of a speech delivered in Commemoration of National Victory Day, on September 6). Government Printing Press: Malta.

Maier, J., Faas, T., Rittberger, B. et al. (2017). "An event that could have made a difference: Effects of the Eurovision Debate on young citizens’ and its consequence for EU democracy – Evidence from a quasi-experiment in 24 countries.” Journal of European Public Policy.

Novelli, E., Rafter, K., Poulakidakos, S., Veneti, A., Veríssimo, E., Álvares, A. & Sammut, C., (2017). ‘The Economic Crisis and Austerity’ in Political Advertising, (pp 57–80). In C. Holtz-Bacha, E. Novelli & K. Rafter (Eds.). The 2014 European Parliament Elections., Palgrave & Macmillan: UK.

Sammut, C., (2017) ‘The Face of Evil in the era of Liberal Peace: Media Debates around the cases of Jyllands-Posten and Charlie Hebdo’, (127-146). In Borg, Carmel and Grech, Michael, (eds). Pedagogy, Politics and Philosophy of Peace and Peace-Making, Bloomsbury: UK.

Murphy, B. & Sammut, C., (2016). ‘Situating the Media: Facts and History" in, (pp 425–441). M. Briguglio & M. Brown. (eds.) Sociology of the Maltese Islands. Malta: Miller Distributors.

Sammut, C., (2013) ‘Gender and political engagement: Assessing the role of the media in the Maltese Islands’ (pp 221–231). In F. Sadiqi (ed.). Women and Knowledge in the Mediterranean, Routledge: UK, USA, Canada.

Sammut, C. (2012), ‘Mintoff, l-Istampa u x-Xandir", (pp. 159–192). In S. Grech (Ed.). Duminku Mintoff: Bejn Storja u Miti. Horizons: Malta.

Sammut, C., (2011) ‘Producing News Texts in receiving countries: beyond journalists’ professional ideology and cultural explanations’, In I. Ureta Vaquero, (ed.). Media, Migration and Public Opinion: Myths, Prejudices and the Challenge of Attaining Mutual Understanding between Europe and North Africa, Peter Lang: Berne.

Sammut, C., (2009). ‘Partisan Media in Malta’, in Media in Malta. (pp 83–102). J. Borg, M.A. Lauri & A. Hillman. (eds.). Malta: Progress Press.

Sammut, C., (2009) ‘Reassessing the Maltese Media System’, in Malta and the Maltese., (eds.) G. Cassar & J. Cutajar. 2007.

Sammut, C. (2007), ‘The Ambiguous Borderline between Human Rights and National Security: The Journalist's Dilemma in the Reporting of Irregular Immigrants in Malta’, Global Media Journal: Mediterranean Edition, vol. 2, n.1.

Sammut, C., (2007). Media and Maltese Society, (Lexington Press, Lanham, USA)

Sammut C., (2007). ‘Il-Gurnalisti Professjonisti: Riflessjonijiet, Aspirazzjonijiet ghal status professjonali’. Malta Journalism Review vol. 1 (2).

Sammut C., (2006). ‘Reviewing a strategy aimed to improve the quality of Children's Programmes in Malta’, Conference proceeding on Quality Children's Programmes held on 8 June 2006. Malta: Broadcasting Authority.

References 

1966 births
Living people
Academic staff of the University of Malta